Lebeda cognata is a moth of the family Lasiocampidae first described by Karl Grünberg in 1913. It is found on Borneo, Peninsular Malaysia and Sumatra.

Larvae have been recorded eating Trema, Citrus and Rosa.

External links

Lasiocampinae
Moths described in 1913
Taxa named by Karl Grünberg